George Alexander Keay  (14 March 1897 – 8 August 1981) was a Scottish first-class cricketer and educator.

Keay was born in March 1897 at Broughty Ferry, Forfarshire. He was educated in England at Whitgift School, after which he immediately enlisted in the British Army as a second lieutenant with the Royal Field Artillery in July 1916. He was promoted to lieutenant in January 1918 and was awarded the Military Cross in the 1919 Birthday Honours. Following the war he resigned his commission and matriculated to Brasenose College, Oxford. While studying at Oxford, he made three appearances in first-class cricket for Oxford University, playing against the Gentlemen of England and the Australian Imperial Forces cricket team in 1919, and the British Army cricket team in 1920. He scored 26 runs in his three matches and took 3 wickets.

After graduating from Oxford, Keay became a schoolmaster. He gave evidence in the 1953 trial of Miles Giffard, whom he had taught at Rugby School, testifying to Giffard's strange behaviour whilst a pupil. Keay died at Swanage in August 1981.

References

External links

1897 births
1981 deaths
People from Broughty Ferry
People educated at Whitgift School
British Army personnel of World War I
Royal Field Artillery officers
Recipients of the Military Cross
Alumni of Brasenose College, Oxford
Scottish cricketers
Oxford University cricketers
Scottish schoolteachers